is a Japanese anime television series based on Miguel de Cervantes' Don Quixote. The 23-episode series was directed by Kunihiko Yuyama and was first broadcast on Tokyo Channel 12 in 1980.

The series was dubbed in English by Ziv International under the name Don Quixote in the Tales of La Mancha. The home video company Krypton Force released selected episodes of the series on VHS in the United Kingdom.

References

External links
 

1980 anime television series debuts
Ashi Productions
TV Tokyo original programming
Works based on Don Quixote